Mona is an unincorporated community and census-designated place in Mitchell County, Iowa, United States. As of the 2010 Census the population of Mona was 34. Mona is located in the northern portion of Mitchell County, one mile south of the Minnesota border, along U.S. Route 218

Demographics

History

Mona got its start in the year 1869, following construction of the Illinois Central Railroad through that territory. Mona was platted May 30, 1870, in sections 11 and 14, by Mary C. Agard, Benjamin Agard, Edward Gregory, and Charles Gregory.

Mona had one school building, with an enrollment of 56 students, with two teachers, in 1917.

Around that time, Mona had begun to decline in importance when most railroading business had been transferred to Lyle, Minnesota, across the Iowa-Minnesota border.

References

Unincorporated communities in Mitchell County, Iowa
Unincorporated communities in Iowa